Darius Degutis is a Lithuanian diplomat who served as Lithuanian ambassador to Poland and Israel in the early 2000s and later served in Australia. Degutis was awarded the Commander's Cross of the Order for Merits to Lithuania in 2003.

Education and career 
Degutis studied at the Vilnius University. After graduating from university, he joined the Lithuanian branch of the International Chamber of Commerce and later moved to Audėjas company where he served as Export Manager from 1991 to 1992. His diplomatic career started with his appointment to the Ministry of Foreign Affairs as the first secretary of the Nordic department in 1991 before being appointed adviser to the deputy head of Mission of the Lithuanian Embassy in Denmark in 1992. He served as the head of the political cooperation division of the European integration department of the Ministry of Foreign Affairs from 1995 to 1998 when he was appointed minister-adviser at the Lithuanian Mission in Washington D.C. and worked there from 1998 to 2001.

He was appointed Lithuanian ambassador to Poland in 2001 and served until 2004 when he was appointed to head the international cooperation division of the Seimas and remained in this position for two years. From 2006 to 2008, he was ambassador of the economic security policy department of the Ministry of Foreign Affairs for special assignments, representative of the Prime Minister of Lithuania for Lithuanian and Polish energy projects. He was ambassador extraordinary and plenipotentiary of Lithuania to Israel, South Africa, and Ethiopia from 2009 to 2014 and was appointed ambassador to Australia in 2021.

References 

Living people
Lithuanian diplomats
Vilnius University alumni
Ambassadors of Lithuania to Poland
Ambassadors of Lithuania to Israel
Ambassadors of Lithuania to South Africa
Year of birth missing (living people)